Vitaly Nikolaevich Potapenko (pronounced vee-TAH-lee poe-TAH-pen-koe, born March 21, 1975) is a Ukrainian former professional basketball player who is currently an assistant coach for the Memphis Grizzlies of the National Basketball Association (NBA). He played college basketball at Wright State University and was selected 12th overall by the Cleveland Cavaliers in the 1996 NBA draft, also the last pick before Kobe Bryant, believed by many as the best player from the 1996 draft. Nicknamed "The Ukraine Train", he played for the Cleveland Cavaliers, the Boston Celtics, the Seattle SuperSonics, and the Sacramento Kings of the NBA, as well as MMT Estudiantes in the Spanish ACB.

Since retiring as a player, Potapenko has been serving as an assistant coach for several teams, among them the Fort Wayne Mad Ants, the Indiana Pacers, the Dakota Wizards, and the Santa Cruz Warriors and later as an assistant director of player development for the Cleveland Cavaliers, helping them win their first ever NBA championship.

See also

 List of foreign NBA coaches

Notes

External links

 NBA.com Profile
 Cleveland Cavaliers' Front Office

1975 births
Living people
Basketball players from Kyiv
BC Budivelnyk players
Boston Celtics players
CB Estudiantes players
Centers (basketball)
Cleveland Cavaliers assistant coaches
Cleveland Cavaliers draft picks
Cleveland Cavaliers players
Dakota Wizards coaches
Memphis Grizzlies assistant coaches
Fort Wayne Mad Ants coaches
Indiana Pacers assistant coaches
Liga ACB players
National Basketball Association players from Ukraine
Power forwards (basketball)
Sacramento Kings players
Santa Cruz Warriors coaches
Seattle SuperSonics players
Ukrainian expatriate basketball people in Spain
Ukrainian expatriate basketball people in the United States
Ukrainian men's basketball players
Wright State Raiders men's basketball players